Norberto Enrique Corella Torres (born 8 August 1951) is a Mexican politician affiliated with the National Action Party. As of 2003 to 2006 he served as Deputy of the LIX Legislature of the Mexican Congress representing Baja California.

References

1951 births
Living people
People from Chihuahua (state)
National Action Party (Mexico) politicians
Deputies of the LIX Legislature of Mexico
Members of the Chamber of Deputies (Mexico) for Baja California